The Provincial Assembly of the City-province of Kinshasa (French, l’Assemblée provinciale de la ville-province de Kinshasa) is the legislative body of the City-province of Kinshasa. Godefroid Mpoy Kadima is the speaker of the provincial assembly.

Members 
The Assembly is made up of 48 members, including 44 elected in the 24 electoral districts, one per municipality, and four co-opted members assigned to customary chiefs.

Bibliography

References 

Kinshasa
Provincial legislatures of the Democratic Republic of the Congo